Grail was a free extensible multi-platform web browser written in the Python programming language. The project was started in August 1995, with its first public release in November of that year. The last official release was version 0.6 in 1999.

One of the major distinguishing features of Grail was the ability to run client-side Python code, in much the same way as mainstream browsers run client-side JavaScript code.

The name Grail is thought to be a tribute to Monty Python and the Holy Grail, a film by the British comedy group Monty Python. The name follows a similar suit to that of Python's─the programming language was too named after Monty Python.

References

External links

1995 software
Free software programmed in Python
Free web browsers
Macintosh web browsers
POSIX web browsers
Windows web browsers